The Glacidorbidae is a taxonomic family of freshwater snails.

Taxonomy

2005 taxonomy 
Glacidorbidae is the only family in the superfamily Glacidorboidea. Glacidorboidea has been classified within the informal group Lower Heterobranchia in the taxonomy of Bouchet & Rocroi (2005).

2010 taxonomy 
Jörger et al. (2010) redefined the major groups within the Heterobranchia; they moved Glacidorboidea to Panpulmonata.

Genera
Genera within the family Glacidorbidae include:
 Glacidorbis Iredale, 1943 – the type genus
 Gondwanorbis Ponder, 1986
 Benthodorbis Ponder & Avern, 2000
 Striadorbis Ponder & Avern, 2000
 Tasmodorbis Ponder & Avern, 2000

References

Further reading 
 Ponder W. F. & Avern G. J. (2000) "The Glacidorbidae (Mollusca: Gastropoda: Heterobranchia) of Australia". Records of the Australian Museum 52: 307–353. HTM

External links 

 
Gastropod families
Taxa named by Winston Ponder